Gingerbread is a 2019 novel by Helen Oyeyemi.

Writing and composition
Oyeyemi lives in Prague, and the local tradition of producing gingerbread, known as perník, inspired its inclusion in the book.

Reception
Eowyn Ivey, in a review for the New York Times Book Review, praised the book as "jarring, funny, surprising, unsettling, disorienting and rewarding."

References

2019 British novels
Novels by Helen Oyeyemi
Picador (imprint) books
English-language books
Works based on Hansel and Gretel